Iana is a commune in Vaslui County, Western Moldavia, Romania. It is composed of five villages: Hălărești, Iana, Recea, Siliștea and Vadurile.

References

Communes in Vaslui County
Localities in Western Moldavia